Murakami Station is the name of multiple train stations in Japan.

 Murakami Station (Chiba) in Chiba Prefecture
 Murakami Station (Niigata) in Niigata Prefecture